Rameshwar Prasad ( – 3 January 2020) was an Indian politician from Uttar Pradesh belonging to Indian National Congress. He was a legislator of the Uttar Pradesh Legislative Assembly.

Biography
Prasad was elected as a member of the Uttar Pradesh Legislative Assembly from Baberu in 1980 and served until 1985.

Prasad died on 3 January 2020 from kidney disease.

References

Place of birth missing
1930s births
2020 deaths
Deaths from kidney disease
Indian National Congress politicians from Uttar Pradesh
People from Banda district, India
Members of the Uttar Pradesh Legislative Assembly